The Chilean Blob was a large mass of tissue found on Pinuno Beach in Los Muermos, Chile in July 2003. The Chilean Blob made headlines around the world because biologists were initially unable to identify it, and were speculating that it was the remains of some species of giant octopus previously unknown to science.

In June 2004, DNA found in the blob was found to match that of a sperm whale: the blob was a large mass of adipose tissue, the partial remains of a dead sperm whale.

References

Globsters
Natural history of Chile
Los Lagos Region
2003 in Chile
Coasts of Los Lagos Region